Chanakya Thanthram is a 2018 Malayalam-language film produced by  Miracle productions. The film is directed by Kannan Thamarakkulam, and stars Unni Mukundan, Anoop Menon, Shruti Ramachandran and Shivada Nair in the lead roles along with Indrans,   Hareesh Perumanna. The music is composed by Shaan Rahman. The film is based on a story written by Dinesh Pallath. The movie is a remake of 2014 Tamil movie Thegidi.

Plot 
Arjun is a topper in criminology who is just out from college. He aspires to become a private detective and searches for available options. He receives an offer from a private agency in Kochi and accepts. He was asked to monitor and prepare whereabouts about a few subjects. He becomes overconfident as he solves some cases before his scheduled time. Meanwhile, he falls in love with an orphan named Andrea. In the meantime, he also witnesses that his earlier subjects were mysteriously murdered one by one. Tensions erupt when he becomes doubtful about the credibility of his mentor agency when they ask him to keep track of Andrea. Later he understands that he has been trapped and tries to resolve it using his intelligence and with help from IPS Officer Iqbal who is investigating the murders.

Cast

Soundtrack 
The music department is a combination of music director Shaan Rahman along with lyricists Afsal Komath, Kaithapram D Namboothiri and Hari Narayanan.

 "Etho vazhitharayil"- Unni Mukundan, Tessa Chavara
"Padaporuthana"-Shaan Rahman
"Naadin Raajathiyo"-Sree Lakshmi

References

External links

2018 films
2010s Malayalam-language films
Films shot in Kochi
Films directed by Kannan Thamarakkulam
Malayalam remakes of Tamil films